This is a list of Chicago White Sox owners and executives.

Owners

General managers

Harry Grabiner (1915–1945)
Leslie O'Connor (1946–1948)
Frank Lane (1948–1955)
Chuck Comiskey (1956–1958)
Johnny Rigney (1956–1958)
Hank Greenberg (1959–1961)
Ed Short (1961–1970)
Roland Hemond (1970–1985)
Ken Harrelson (1985–June 1986)
Tom Haller (June 1986–October 1986)
Larry Himes (1986–1990)
Ron Schueler (1990–2000)
Kenny Williams (2000–2012)
Rick Hahn (2012–present)

Other executives
Bill DeWitt
Dave Dombrowski
Scott Reifert
Terry Savarise
David Wilder

External links
Baseball America: Executive Database

 
 
Chicago White Sox
Owners